Tampereen Ilves (Finnish for "Lynx") is a Finnish football club, based in Tampere. They currently play in the Veikkausliiga, the highest level of professional football in Finland.

History 
They were formed in 1975 as a merger between Ilves-Kissat Tampere and TaPa Tampere, and joined the Premier Division in 1979.

Ilves won the Finnish League championship in 1983 and the Finnish Cup on three occasions in 1979, 1990, and 2019.

In the late 1990s, Ilves suffered financial trouble and its professional team was reformed into Tampere United before the 1999 season. The initial plan was to join Ilves with TPV, but TPV decided to continue as its own team. As a result, Tampere United inherited Ilves' place in the second highest division, and Ilves dissolved their men’s team. Thus the club did not have a men's team from 1999 to 2007.

Markus Räikkönen, husband of Finnish Prime Minister Sanna Marin played in the U19 section of the club.

Their home ground is Tammelan Stadion. However, in 2020–2023, they are playing at Tampere Stadium, while waiting for a new Tammelan stadion to be built.

Honours 
Mestaruussarja/Veikkausliiga
Champions: 1983

Finnish Cup
 Winners: 1979, 1990, 2019

Season to season

European record

Current squad

As of 17 February 2023.

Management and boardroom

Management
As of 4 February 2023.

Boardroom
As of 31 July 2020

Ilves/2 
Ilves/2 is the reserve team of Ilves. The team plays in Kakkonen in 2020 season. It is coached by Topi Priha.

Managers
 Raimo Vasama (1975)
 Martti Halme (1976–1977)
 Pertti Mäkipää (1978–1981)
 Jussi Ristimäki (1982–1984)
 Turo Flink (1985–1986)
 Harri Holli (1987–1989)
 Jussi Ristimäki (1990)
 Ian Crawford (1991–1992)
 Matti Paatelainen (1993)
 Markku Wacklin (1993–1994)
 Esa Kuusisto (1995–1996)
 Arto Uimonen (1997)
 Ari Hjelm (1997)
 Kari Nikkilä (1998)
 Janne Salovaara / Jarmo Virtanen (2001)
 Veijo Visuri (2008–2009)
  Valeri Popovitch (2010–11)
 Mika Malinen (2012–2014)
 Keith Armstrong (2015)
 Jarkko Wiss (2016–2021)
 Toni Kallio (2021–present)

See also
 Ilves (ice hockey)

References

External links
Official club home page

Football clubs in Finland
Sport in Tampere
1931 establishments in Finland